The Thomas Goode Jones School of Law  (FaulknerLaw, Jones Law, JLS, or JSL) is the law school  of Faulkner University, located in Montgomery, Alabama.

History 
Jones School of Law was founded in 1928 by Montgomery County Circuit Judge Walter B. Jones. The law school is named after Judge Walter B. Jones' father, Thomas Goode Jones, a Confederate veteran who was governor of Alabama and U.S. District Judge for the Northern and Middle Districts of Alabama.

Faulkner University acquired Jones School of Law in 1983.

Faulkner University’s Thomas Goode Jones School of Law is fully accredited by the American Bar Association (ABA). Graduates are eligible to sit for the bar exam in any state.

Admissions
For the class entering in 2022, out of 411 applicants 47.93% were admitted, 50.76% of those admitted enrolled, with the average enrolled student having an LSAT score of 151 and a 3.18 GPA.

Employment
According to Jones' official ABA-required disclosures, 58.6% of the Class of 2021 obtained full-time, long-term, JD-required employment nine months after graduation.

Costs 
Tuition at Thomas Goode Jones School of Law for the 2020–2021 academic year was $39,000.

Programs 
Thomas Goode Jones School of Law offers a joint J.D./LL.M. in dispute resolution, as well as a J.D. program.

Notable alumni 
Bobby Bright, former member of the United States House of Representatives representing Alabama's 2nd congressional district
Tommy Bryan, Associate Justice of the Supreme Court of Alabama
Alisa Kelli Wise, Associate Justice of the Supreme Court of Alabama

Notable faculty 
John Eidsmoe, professor of law emeritus.
Allison Garrett, assistant professor of law (2004 to 2007); as of 2021,  Chancellor of the Oklahoma State System of Higher Education

References

External links 
 

Law schools in Alabama
Universities and colleges in Montgomery, Alabama
Educational institutions established in 1928
1928 establishments in Alabama
Faulkner University